Physocnemum andreae is a species of beetle in the family Cerambycidae. Known as the cypress bark borer, this type of beetle is native to eastern North America and is classified as uncommon.

References

Callidiini
Beetles described in 1847